John Wood House is a historic home located at Huntington Station in Suffolk County, New York. It was built about 1704 and is a four bay, one story dwelling which has a saltbox profile and massive central chimney.  Also on the property is a gable roofed well structure.

It was added to the National Register of Historic Places in 1985.

References

Houses on the National Register of Historic Places in New York (state)
Houses completed in 1704
Houses in Suffolk County, New York
National Register of Historic Places in Huntington (town), New York
1704 establishments in the Province of New York